East Timor, also known as Timor-Leste and officially as the Democratic Republic of Timor-Leste, competed at the 2016 Summer Olympics in Rio de Janeiro, Brazil, from 5 to 21 August 2016. This was the nation's fourth consecutive appearance at the Summer Olympics.

Three athletes, one man and two women, were selected to the East Timorese roster for the Games, competing only in athletics and mountain biking (the nation's Olympic debut in Rio de Janeiro). Among them were middle-distance runners Nélia Martins and Augusto Ramos Soares, the lone male and returning Olympian, and mountain biker Francelina Cabral, who eventually became the nation's flag bearer in the opening ceremony.

East Timor, however, has yet to win its first ever Olympic medal.

Athletics

East Timor received universality slots from IAAF to send two athletes (one male and one female) to the Olympics.

Track & road events

Cycling

Mountain biking
East Timor received an invitation from Tripartite Commission to send a mountain biker for the women's Olympic cross-country race, signifying the nation's debut in the sport outside of athletics. Previously, two East Timorese athletes competed in weightlifting and boxing under the Olympic flag while awaiting recognition of their national Olympic Committee.

References

External links 

 
 

Nations at the 2016 Summer Olympics
2016
2016 in East Timor